Dibromopropane is a molecule that contains three carbon atoms, six hydrogen atoms, and two bromine atoms. It may refer to any of four isomers:

1,2-Dibromopropane
1,3-Dibromopropane

2,2-Dibromopropane